Jean-Marie Joseph Armand Brulard was a French Général de Division who participated in World War I. He spent an extensive part of his military career in Tunisia, Tonkin, Algeria, Madagascar, Morocco and the Dardanelles. He was once told by a superior that: "Son nom est un drapeau." ("His name is a flag"). He was also known for being a recipient of the Grand Cross of the Legion of Honour.

Biography
Brulard was born on March 1, 1856, at Besançon, Doubs. After being promoted to Brigadier General in 1912, he went on a business trip to Morocco to reorganize the army there. Just after the French entry into World War I, on September 19, 1914, he was given command of the 2nd Infantry Division. He was promoted to Général de Division on October 25, 1914, and participated on the Gallipoli campaign.

On May 23, 1916, he commanded the 157th Infantry Division and the 131st Infantry Division on January 28, 1917. After being placed on the reserves on June 10, 1917, Brulard was available again by September 1, 1918. On November 6, 1918, he was the military governor of the Russian base at Laval due to the ongoing Russian Civil War. He retired on August 15, 1919, and died on November 19, 1923, at Nanterre.

Legacy
Several streets bear his name, notably in Besançon, his home town, as well as in Lyon.

Awards
Legion of Honour, Grand Cross (January 9, 1918)
Legion of Honour, Grand Officer (October 28, 1915)
Legion of Honour, Commander (July 11, 1912)
Legion of Honour, Officer (July 12, 1905)
Legion of Honour, Knight (July 10, 1894)
Croix de guerre 1914–1918
Colonial Medal (Tonkin and Morocco variants)
1914–1918 Inter-Allied Victory medal
Tonkin Expedition commemorative medal
Madagascar commemorative medal (1896)
Morocco commemorative medal (Casablanca clasp)
Commemorative Medal of the 1914–1918 War
Dardanelles campaign medal

Foreign Awards
 Morocco: Order of Ouissam Alaouite, Grand Officer
 Tunisia: Nichan Iftikhar, Grand Officer

References

1856 births
1923 deaths
French military personnel of the Sino-French War
French military personnel of the Madagascar expeditions
French military personnel of World War I
People from Besançon
French generals
Grand Croix of the Légion d'honneur
Grand Officiers of the Légion d'honneur
Commandeurs of the Légion d'honneur
Officiers of the Légion d'honneur
Chevaliers of the Légion d'honneur
École Spéciale Militaire de Saint-Cyr alumni